Gypsite was a small community at the site of a mill in Kern County, California.

History
In late 1909 Charles Koehn found a large deposit of gypsite (a mixture of gypsum and clay) in the bed of Koehn Lake.  In 1910 or 1911, the California Crown Plaster & Gypsite Company leased Koehn's claims and built a mill at Kane (Cane) Spring, located just north of Gypsite.  A post office operated at Gypsite from June 1911 to March 1912.  In January 1912, Koehn was involved in a shootout at "Cain" springs where he constructed a rolling fort and held off 17 gunman during a dispute with T.H. Rosenberger about Koehn's mineral claims. During the summer of 1912, 12 men produced 30 tons of plaster per day.  In December, 1912, after a court case concerning the gunfight, Koehn sold the springs to Thomas Thorkildsen who then sold to the Diamond Salt Company of Los Angeles. In 1913, a 3-mile narrow-gauge railroad was built on the lake bed.  The company also built a hotel, houses, a depot and a post office (which was never reopened).

In 1915, the operation failed and Koehn took over the mill.  Production was intermittent until 1928, when Koehn was convicted of attempted murder of a San Bernardino judge and Koehn lost control of the site.  George Abel took over production until his death in the early 1930s.  Intermittent production again continued until the 1950s.

References

External links
  - Newspaper articles about Gypsite

Populated places in the Mojave Desert
Unincorporated communities in Kern County, California
Mining communities in California
Unincorporated communities in California